This is a list of Vegas Golden Knights award winners.

League awards

Team trophies

Individual awards

All-Stars

NHL first and second team All-Stars
The NHL first and second team All-Stars are the top players at each position as voted on by the Professional Hockey Writers' Association.

All-Star Game selections
The National Hockey League All-Star Game is a mid-season exhibition game held annually between many of the top players of each season. Two All-Star Games has been held since the Vegas Golden Knights entered the league in 2017, with at least one player chosen to represent the franchise in each year. The All-Star game has not been held in various years: 1979 and 1987 due to the 1979 Challenge Cup and Rendez-vous '87 series between the NHL and the Soviet national team, respectively, 1995, 2005, and 2013 as a result of labor stoppages, 2006, 2010, and 2014 because of the Winter Olympic Games, and 2021 as a result of the COVID-19 pandemic.

Career achievements

Hockey Hall of Fame
The Vegas Golden Knights have not had any players or personnel who have been enshrined in the Hockey Hall of Fame.

Retired numbers

The Vegas Golden Knights have retired one of their jersey numbers. The number 58 was retired by the team on March 31, 2018, in honor of the 58 victims killed in the 2017 Las Vegas shooting. Also out of circulation is the number 99 which was retired league-wide for Wayne Gretzky on February 6, 2000.

Team awards

First Star Award
The First Star Award is an annual award which is given to the player who won the most votes in three star voting for home games throughout the regular season.

Seventh Player Award
The Seventh Player Award is an annual award which is given to the player "whose performance on the ice most exceeded fan expectations" as determined by Golden Knights fans.

Vegas Strong Service Award
The Vegas Strong Service Award is an annual award which is given to the player "most involved in serving and giving back to the Las Vegas community" as selected by Vegas Golden Knights staff.

Other awards

See also
List of National Hockey League awards

References

Vegas Golden Knights
award